The Cumberland Apartments is a building complex located in downtown Portland, Oregon, that is listed on the National Register of Historic Places.

Further reading

See also
 National Register of Historic Places listings in Southwest Portland, Oregon

References

External links

1910 establishments in Oregon
Residential buildings completed in 1910
Apartment buildings on the National Register of Historic Places in Portland, Oregon
Tudor Revival architecture in Oregon
Southwest Portland, Oregon
Portland Historic Landmarks